The Premio Regina Elena is a Group 3 flat horse race in Italy open to three-year-old thoroughbred fillies. It is run over a distance of 1,600 metres (about 1 mile) at Capannelle in April or May.

It is Italy's equivalent of the 1000 Guineas, a famous race in England.

History
The event is named after Elena of Montenegro, who became Queen of Italy when her husband acceded to the throne in 1900. It was established in 1907, and the inaugural running was won by Madree.

The title of the race was shortened to Premio Elena in 1943. It reverted to its original name in 1965.

For a period the Premio Regina Elena held Group 1 status. It was downgraded to Group 2 level in 1988, and to Group 3 in 2007.

Several winners of the Premio Regina Elena have gone on to win the Oaks d'Italia. The first was Makufa in 1912, and the most recent was Cherry Collect in 2012.

The race is currently run on the same day as its colts' counterpart, the Premio Parioli.

Records
Leading jockey (6 wins):
 Enrico Camici – Astolfina (1948), Giambellina (1954), Theodorica (1955), Angela Rucellai (1957), Rossellina (1960), Tadolina (1965)
 Sergio Fancera – Anticlea (1963), Brioche (1968), Azzurrina (1978), Martin's Girl (1979), Right Bank (1983), Miss Gris (1985)

Leading trainer since 1985 (6 wins):
 Bruno Grizzetti – Shenck (1999), Xua (2000), Sadowa (2002), Rumba Loca (2004), Lokaloka (2007), Stay Alive (2011)

Leading owner (16 wins): (includes part ownership)
 Federico Tesio – Veronesa (1908), Angelica Kauffmann (1909), Claudia Lorena (1915), Gianpietrina (1917), Duccia di Buoninsegna (1923), Gherarda delle Notti (1926), Delleana (1928), Nannoccia (1930), Nogara (1931), Jacopa del Sellaio (1932), Dossa Dossi (1933), Bernina (1934), Dagherotipia (1939), Tokamura (1943), Astolfina (1948), Giambellina (1954)

Winners since 1985

Earlier winners

 1907: Madree
 1908: Veronesa
 1909: Angelica Kauffmann
 1910: La Matchiche
 1911: Androclea
 1912: Makufa
 1913: Sigma
 1914: Ten
 1915: Claudia Lorena
 1916: Vanetta
 1917: Gianpietrina
 1918: Ardea *
 1919: Alcimaca
 1920: Alciope
 1921: Ellera
 1922: Fraschetta
 1923: Duccia di Buoninsegna
 1924: Pomella
 1925: Bilitis
 1926: Gherarda delle Notti
 1927: Maja
 1928: Delleana
 1929: Arcibella
 1930: Nannoccia
 1931: Nogara
 1932: Jacopa del Sellaio
 1933: Dossa Dossi
 1934: Bernina
 1935: Colibri
 1936: Archidamia
 1937: Amerina
 1938: Brunellesca
 1939: Dagherotipia
 1940: Peruviana
 1941: Beatrice
 1942: Venere
 1943: Tokamura
 1944: Dalmazia *
 1945: no race
 1946: Odola
 1947: Zambra
 1948: Astolfina
 1949: Meda
 1950: Saccaroa
 1951: Baronessa
 1952: Sannita
 1953: Mezzegra
 1954: Giambellina
 1955: Theodorica
 1956: Moleca
 1957: Angela Rucellai
 1958: Algaiola
 1959: Cesaproba
 1960: Rossellina
 1961: Ninabella
 1962: Alibella
 1963: Anticlea
 1964: Bronzina
 1965: Tadolina
 1966: Alhambra
 1967: Dolina
 1968: Brioche
 1969: Volsini
 1970: Alea
 1971: Adelaide Adams
 1972: Kerkenna
 1973: La Zanzara
 1974: Grande Nube
 1975: Synthesis
 1976: Dir el Gobi
 1977: Roman Blue
 1978: Azzurrina
 1979: Martin's Girl
 1980: Tibalda
 1981: Val d'Erica
 1982: Rosananti
 1983: Right Bank
 1984: Honey

* The race took place at Milan in 1918 and 1944.

See also
 List of Italian flat horse races

References
 Racing Post:

 galopp-sieger.de – Premio Regina Elena.
 ifhaonline.org – International Federation of Horseracing Authorities – Premio Regina Elena (2019).
 pedigreequery.com – Premio Regina Elena – Roma Capannelle.
 tbheritage.com – Premio Regina Elena.

Flat horse races for three-year-old fillies
Sports competitions in Rome
Horse races in Italy
1907 establishments in Italy
Recurring sporting events established in 1907